Jerzy Pietrzak (born 19 July 1962 in Krakow) is a Polish sport shooter. He competed in pistol shooting events at the Summer Olympics in 1988, 1992, 1996, and 2000.

Olympic results

References

1962 births
Living people
ISSF pistol shooters
Polish male sport shooters
Shooters at the 1988 Summer Olympics
Shooters at the 1992 Summer Olympics
Shooters at the 1996 Summer Olympics
Shooters at the 2000 Summer Olympics
Olympic shooters of Poland
Sportspeople from Kraków
20th-century Polish people